Pareques is a genus of fish of the family Sciaenidae in the order of the Perciformes.

Species
The species of this genus are:
 Pareques acuminatus (Bloch & Schneider, 1801), high-hat
 Pareques fuscovittatus (Kendall & Radcliffe, 1912), festive drum
 Pareques iwamotoi Miller & Woods, 1988, blackbar drum
 Pareques lanfeari (Barton, 1947), royal high-hat
 Pareques lineatus (Cuvier, 1830), southern high-hat
 Pareques perissa (Heller & Snodgrass, 1903), odd high-hat
 Pareques umbrosus (Jordan & Eigenmann, 1889), Cubbyu
 Pareques viola (Gilbert, 1898), Pacific high-hat

References

 
Sciaenidae